The following is a list of mayors of the city of Goiânia, in Goiás state, Brazil.

 , 1935-1945, 1951-1955
 Ismerindo Soares de Carvalho, 1945-1946, 1947
 Orivaldo Borges Leão, 1946-1947	
 Eurico Viana, 1947-1951		
 Messias de Souza Costa, 1955	
 João de Paula Teixeira Filho, 1955-1959	
 , 1959-1961	
 Hélio Seixo de Brito, 1961-1966	
 Íris Rezende, 1966-1969, 2005-2010, 2017-2020
 , 1969-1970	
 Manuel dos Reis e Silva, 1970-1974	
 Rubens Vieira Guerra, 1974-1975	
 Francisco de Freitas Castro, 1975-1978	
 Hélio Mauro Umbelino Lôbo, 1978-1979	
 , 1979, 1986-1987, 1988
 , 1979-1982	
 , 1982-1983	
 Daniel Borges do Campo, 1983
 , 1983-1985, 1989-1992, 1997-2000		
 Joaquim Roriz, 1987-1988	
 , 1993-1996		
 , 2001-2004		
 Paulo Garcia, 2010-2016	
 Maguito Vilela, 2021
 Rogério Cruz, 2021-

See also
  (city council)
 
 Goiânia history
 Goiânia history (in Portuguese)
  (state)
 List of mayors of largest cities in Brazil (in Portuguese)
 List of mayors of capitals of Brazil (in Portuguese)

References

This article incorporates information from the Portuguese Wikipedia.

Goiania